The Parapan American Games is an international multi-sport event for athletes with physical disabilities held every four years after every Pan American Games. The first Games were held in 1999 in Mexico City, Mexico. The 2003 Parapan American Games was the last Parapan American Games that was not held in the same city as the Pan American Games. The most recent games was the 5th Parapan American Games which took place in 2019 with the host city being Lima, Peru. The next Parapan American Games are scheduled between 17 and 26 November 2023, in Santiago, Chile.

Games

Sports

All-time medal table 
Last updated after the 2019 Parapan American Games.

Youth Games
The Youth Parapan American Games is an international multi-sport event for athletes aged 12 to 21 with physical disabilities. The games were created after the 2003 Pan American Games in order to reduce the large average age gap between countries in the Americas.  The games are held every four years, staggering with the Pan American and Parapan American games, with first of its kind being held in 2005 in Barquisimeto, Venezuela.

List of Youth Parapan American Games

See also
 Pan American Games
Paralympic Games
African Para Games
Asian Para Games
European Para Championships

References

External links
 Americas Paralympic Committee

 
Youth Parapan American Games
Disabled multi-sport events
Recurring sporting events established in 1999
Games
Sports competitions in the Americas
Multi-sport events in North America
Multi-sport events in South America